Soba is a Local Government Area in Kaduna State, Nigeria. Its headquarters is in the town of Maigana.

It has an area of 2,234 km and a population of 293,270 at the 2006 census. Its postal code is 801122. The Local Government Council is chaired by Mohammed Usman.

The postal code of the area is 810.

References

Local Government Areas in Kaduna State